The 1941 North Dakota Agricultural Bison football team was an American football team that represented North Dakota Agricultural College (now known as North Dakota State University) in the North Central Conference (NCC) during the 1941 college football season.  In its first season under head coach Stan Kostka, the team compiled a 2–7 record (2–4 against NCC opponents) and finished fourth in the NCC. The team played its home games at Dacotah Field in Fargo, North Dakota.

Prior to the 1941 season, the Bison had not won a game against a NCC opponent since 1938. The team broke the streak with two conference victories in 1941.

Schedule

References

North Dakota Agricultural
North Dakota State Bison football seasons
North Dakota Agricultural Bison football